An election to Carmarthen District Council were held in May 1976.  It was preceded by the 1973 election and followed by the 1979 election. On the same day there were elections to the other local authorities and community councils in Wales.

The overwhelming majority of seats were held by Independent candidates. Severals Labour candidates were returned but all five Plaid Cymru candidates were defeated. The vice chairman of the authority, Glyn Howell, was defeated by another Independent at Newcastle Emlyn.

Results

Abergwili and Llanllawddog (one seat)

Abernant (one seat)

Carmarthen Town Ward One (four seats)

Carmarthen Town Ward Two (two seats)

Carmarthen Town Ward Three (three seats)

Cilymaenllwyd (one seat)

Cynwyl Elfed and Llanpumsaint (one seat)

Henllanfallteg (one seat)

Laugharne Township (two seats)

Llanarthney and Llanddarog (three seats)

Llandyfaelog (two seats)

Llangeler (two seats)

Llanfihangel-ar-Arth (one seat)

Llanfihangel Rhos-y-Corn (one seat)

Llangain (one seat)

Llangynnwr (two seats)

Llangyndeyrn (two seats)

Llanllwni (two seats)

Newcastle Emlyn (one seat)

St Clears (two seats)

Whitland (one seat)

References

1976
1976 Welsh local elections
20th century in Carmarthenshire
May 1976 events in the United Kingdom